James Henry Hazel (July 21, 1888 - January 1965) was an American politician who served as the eighth Lieutenant Governor of Delaware, from January 15, 1929, to January 17, 1933, under Governor C. Douglass Buck.

References

External links
 Delaware's Lieutenant Governors

Lieutenant Governors of Delaware
1888 births
1965 deaths
Delaware Republicans
20th-century American politicians